Atractus paraguayensis is a species of snake in the family Colubridae. The species can be found in Paraguay and Argentina. It is oviparous.

References 

Atractus
Reptiles of Paraguay
Reptiles of Argentina
Snakes of South America
Reptiles described in 1924
Taxa named by Franz Werner